Lists of fossiliferous stratigraphic units by preserved taxon
Stratigraphic units